This is a list of diplomatic missions of Haiti, excluding honorary consulates. Haiti has a small diplomatic presence worldwide; most of its missions are located in the Americas and the Caribbean.

Africa

 Rabat (Embassy)
 Dakhla (Consulate-General)

 Pretoria (Embassy)

Americas

 Buenos Aires (Embassy)

 Nassau (Embassy)

 Brasilia (Embassy)

 Ottawa (Embassy)
 Montreal (Consulate-General)

 Santiago (Embassy)

 Bogotá (Embassy)

 Havana (Embassy)

 Santo Domingo (Embassy)
 Dajabón (Consulate-General)
 Higüey (Consulate-General)
 Santa Cruz de Barahona (Consulate-General)
 Santiago de los Caballeros (Consulate-General)

 Quito (Embassy)

 Mexico City (Embassy)
 Tapachula (Consulate)

 Panama City (Embassy)

 Paramaribo (Consulate-General)

 Washington, D.C. (Embassy)
 Atlanta (Consulate-General)
 Boston (Consulate-General)
 Chicago (Consulate-General)
 Miami (Consulate-General)
 New York (Consulate-General)
 Orlando (Consulate-General)

 Caracas (Embassy)

Asia

 Beijing (Office of Commercial Development)

 Tokyo (Embassy)

 Doha (Embassy)

 Taipei (Embassy)

 Hanoi (Embassy)

Europe

 Brussels (Embassy)

 Paris (Embassy)
Paris (Consulate-General)
 Cayenne, French Guiana (Consulate-General)
 Pointe-à-Pitre, Guadeloupe (Consulate-General)

 Berlin (Embassy)

 Rome (Embassy)

 Rome (Embassy)

 Oranjestad, Aruba (Consulate-General)
 Willemstad, Curaçao (Consulate-General)

 Madrid (Embassy)

 London (Embassy)
 Providenciales, Turks and Caicos Islands (Consulate-General)

Multilateral organizations
 
Brussels (Mission)
 
Geneva (Permanent Mission)
New York City (Permanent Mission)
 
Washington, D.C. (Permanent Mission)

Gallery

See also
 Foreign relations of Haiti
 Visa policy of Haiti
 Visa requirements for Haitian citizens

Notes

References

Haitian Ministry of Foreign Affairs

 
Haiti
Diplomatic missions